The 1984 CFL Draft composed of eight rounds where over 71 Canadian football players were chosen from eligible Canadian universities and Canadian players playing in the NCAA. A total of nine players were selected as territorial exemptions, with every team but Montreal making at least one selection during this stage of the draft.

Territorial exemptions

British Columbia Lions  Laurent DesLauriers  LB  British Columbia

Calgary Stampeders  Mike Palumbo  OL  Washington State

Edmonton Eskimos  Gord Bolstad  WR  Alberta

Hamilton Tiger-Cats  Ralph Scholz  DT  Cornell

Ottawa Rough Riders  Michel Bourgeau  DT  Boise State

Ottawa Rough Riders (via Montreal)  Jim De Silva  OL  Carleton

Saskatchewan Roughriders  Mike Anderson  OL  San Diego State

Toronto Argonauts  Sterling Hinds  RB  Washington

Winnipeg Blue Bombers  Mike Ethier  WR  South Dakota State

1st round
1. British Columbia Lions                            Frank Balkovec              LB  Toronto

2. Montreal Concordes                            Ian Sinclair  C  Miami (Fla.)

3. Winnipeg Blue Bombers                             Trevor Williams  DB  York

4. Ottawa Rough Riders                               Maurice Martin  DB  Toronto

5. Calgary Stampeders                                Sean McKeown  DL  Western Ontario

6. Edmonton Eskimos                                  Mike Robinson  LB  Utah State

7. Edmonton Eskimos                                  Chris Skinner               TB          Bishop's

8. Edmonton Eskimos                                  John Mandarich              OT  Kent State

9. Saskatchewan Roughriders                          Robert Reid  TB  Simon Fraser

2nd round

3rd round

4th round
27. British Columbia Lions                           Joseph Brouwers            DE              Wilfrid Laurier

28. Saskatchewan Roughriders                         Ed McQuarters              G               Dakota N.W.

29. Saskatchewan Roughriders                         Angelo Visentin           OT  Saint Mary's

30. Saskatchewan Roughriders                         Peter Simpson  OL  Guelph

31. Calgary Stampeders                               Roman Lohin               LB                Alberta

32. Edmonton Eskimos                                 Dan Runge                 TE                Guelph

33. Saskatchewan Roughriders                         Greg Thomas               TB                Concordia

34. Hamilton Tiger-Cats                              Les Kaminski              TB  Montana State

35. Saskatchewan Roughriders                         Dave Sparenberg           DL                Western Ontario

5th round
36. British Columbia Lions                           Tim Tomlin                DB                Carleton

37. Montreal Concordes                               Bill Lawrence  DB  Simon Fraser

38. Winnipeg Blue Bombers                            Tom Hrechkosy             DT  Manitoba

39. Saskatchewan Roughriders                         Mike Ryan  OT  McMaster

40. Calgary Stampeders                               Corrado Filice            TB                  Alberta

41. Edmonton Eskimos                                 Larry Mohr                FB  Queen's

42. Saskatchewan Roughriders                         Wendell Cornwall          LB                 British Columbia

43. Hamilton Tiger-Cats                              Tim Wiens                 DB  Saskatchewan

44. Toronto Argonauts                                David Pearson  SB  Toronto

6th round

7th round
54. British Columbia Lions                           Greg Kitchen              LB                    British Columbia

55. Montreal Concordes                               Steve Lalonde             WR                    Bishop's

56. Winnipeg Blue Bombers                            James Rybachuk            DL                    British Columbia

57. Ottawa Rough Riders                              Mike White  DB  Waterloo

58. Calgary Stampeders                               John Harvie  LB  Calgary

59. Edmonton Eskimos                                 Brad Clark  WR  Alberta

60. Saskatchewan Roughriders                         Ray Wheatley  T  Oregon

61. Hamilton Tiger-Cats                              Leroy Steele  LB  South Dakota State

62. Toronto Argonauts                                Adam Papadakos            TE                       Toronto

8th round

References

Canadian College Draft
Cfl Draft, 1984